Jack of Hearts is a six-part British television crime drama series, written by Sian Orrells and directed by Timothy Lay, that first broadcast on BBC One on 4 August 1999. Set and filmed in Cardiff, the series follows the life of a tough-talking probation officer, Jack Denby (Keith Allen), who finds that life and crime in the Welsh capital is much different to the workings of inner-city London, when he is forced to move away to join his girlfriend, Suzanne (Anna Mountford), a university lecturer.

The series was broadcast on Wednesdays at 21:30, and was also repeated on Thursdays and Saturdays on BBC Choice. The series was also accompanied by a theme written especially for the series, performed by Bonnie Tyler. The series has yet to be released on DVD.

Reception
Mark Lawson of The Guardian gave the series a mixed review, writing; "Keith Allen's new series Jack of Hearts, about a hard-bitten parole officer, is a textbook lesson in formulaic drama. But it might just have that something it needs to find an audience."

Cast
 Keith Allen as Jack Denby 
 Anna Mountford as Suzanne Pryce 
 Ruth Madoc as Jean Pryce 
 Andrew Sachs as Peter Pryce 
 Eluned Jones as Marjorie Haines 
 Caroline Berry as Caroline Evans 
 Steve Toussaint as Joe
 Miranda Llewellyn-Jenkins as Katie 
 Siobhan Flynn as Lisa 
 Geraint Morgan as Eric

Episodes

References

External links

BBC television dramas
1999 British television series debuts
1999 British television series endings
1990s British drama television series
Television shows set in Wales
English-language television shows